Futomi Station may refer to:
 Futomi Station (Chiba) in Chiba, Japan
 Futomi Station (Hokkaido) in Hokkaido, Japan